Africa Fighting Malaria (AFM) was an NGO based in Washington D.C., United States and South Africa which stated that it "seeks to educate people about the scourge of Malaria and the political economy of malaria control". The organization generally "promotes market based solutions and economic freedom as the best ways to ensure improved welfare and longer life expectancy in poor countries", according to their financial statement. Founded in 2000 during the Stockholm Negotiations on Persistent Organic Pollutants, AFM's original focus was the promotion of a public health exemption for the insecticide DDT for malaria control. According to their website, last updated in 2011, their mission was to "make malaria control more transparent, responsive and effective by holding public institutions accountable for funding and implementing effective, integrated and country-driven malaria control policies."

According to IRS filings, the organization spent money entirely on executive compensation, with no program expenses of any kind. It has been described as a front group established to discredit environmentalists. In documents obtained during state litigation against tobacco companies, founder Roger Bate described the organization's purpose as part of a larger strategy to portray first-world environmentalists as unconcerned with Black Africans.

References

External links
 Official website

Malaria organizations
Health campaigns
Medical and health organizations based in Washington, D.C.
Front organizations